The women's quadruple sculls competition at the 2016 Summer Olympics in Rio de Janeiro was held on 6–11 August at the Lagoon Rodrigo de Freitas.

The medals for the competition were presented by Irena Szewińska, Poland, member of the International Olympic Committee, and the gifts were presented by Lenka Wech, Germany, Member of the Executive Committee of the International Rowing Federation.

Results

Heats
Winners of each heat qualify to final, remainder goes to the repechage.

Heat 1

Heat 2

Repechage
First four of heat qualify to Final.

Final

References

Women's quadruple sculls
Women's events at the 2016 Summer Olympics